The Art of Happiness is a 2013 Italian animated drama film written and directed by Alessandro Rak, at his directorial debut. It opened the International Critics' Week at the 70th Venice International Film Festival.

Plot 
Sergio works as a taxi driver in Naples; under a heavy rain, he brings his customers through the increasingly degraded city. At the same time he tries to cope with the death of his brother, who departed for Tibet ten years before and never returned. On the seats of his taxi  a singer, a  radio speaker, an old uncle and other characters alternate, and each of them brings a trace of his missing brother.

Cast 
 Leandro Amato as Sergio Cometa
 Luigi Meola as Young Sergio
 Nando Paone as Alfredo Cometa
 Matteo Russo as Young Alfredo
 Renato Carpentieri as Luciano Cometa
 Jun Ichikawa as Antonia
 Lucio Allocca as Sergio and Alfredo's Father
 Iolanda Semez as Mrs. Pinotta, Sergio and Alfredo's mother.
 Patrizia Di Martino as Erika
 Antonio Brachi as Maurizio Brachetti
 Ciro Cesarano as Nando
 Silvia Baritska as Lariza
 Riccardo Polizzy Carbonelli as Speaker
 Gennaro Matino as himself, the priest in Alfredo's funeral.
 Paola Tortora as Woman in Bass
 Dario Sansone as Man in Bass
 Antonio Funaro as the voice of the taxi's radio.
 Francesca Romana Bergamo as the voice of the radio news
 Robert Thurman as himself

Accolades
The Art of Happiness won the award for best animated film at the 27th European Film Awards.

It also won the audience's award for Best Feature Film at the 2014 Raindance Film Festival.

References

External links

2013 films
European Film Awards winners (films)
Italian animated films
2013 animated films
Italian drama films
Animated drama films
Films set in Naples
2013 directorial debut films
2010s Italian films